Shreya Tripathi (died 9 October 2018) was an Indian health activist.

Tripathi was diagnosed with tuberculosis in 2012. She sought treatment but her strain was found to be extensively drug-resistant tuberculosis, rendering the usual medications ineffective. The Revised National TB Control Program (RNTCP) in India declined to provide her with bedaquiline, a newer drug intended for such cases. With the assistance of Anand Grover, Tripathi filed suit against the RNTCP to force the organization to provide access to the medication. On 20 January 2017, the High Court in Delhi ruled in favour of Tripathi and ordered that she receive the drug. The court further ordered that bedaquiline be made available at 70 Indian treatment centres; it had previously only be obtainable at six. Although her suit was successful, the treatment delay resulted in irreversible scarring to Tripathi's lungs, resulting in her death.

Stephen Lewis highlighted Tripathi's story in a 2017 keynote address. In an article written after Tripathi's death, Lewis and Jennifer Furin suggested that Tripathi "belongs with Malala and Greta in the pantheon of teenagers whose unswerving principles have brought the powerful to their knees".

References

2018 deaths
Indian health activists
Tuberculosis in India